
The Avia BH-28 was a military reconnaissance biplane aircraft developed in Czechoslovakia in 1927 to meet a requirement for such an aircraft by the government of Romania. Avia based the design on their BH-26, but replaced the engine with an Armstrong Siddeley Jaguar, as specified in the requirement. The completed aircraft was taken to Bucharest for demonstration, but no order ensued, and this prototype was the only example constructed.

Specifications

See also

References

 
 Němeček, V. (1968). Československá letadla. Praha: Naše Vojsko.

Single-engined tractor aircraft
Biplanes
1920s Czechoslovakian military reconnaissance aircraft
BH-28
Aircraft first flown in 1927